The Dnieper–Bug estuary is an open estuary, or liman, of two rivers: the Dnieper and the Southern Bug (also called the Boh River). It is located on the northern coast of the Black Sea and is separated from it by Kinburn Spit and the Cape of Ochakiv.

Description

The estuary includes two parts: the wide Dnieper estuary (55 km long, up to 17 km wide), and the narrower Bug estuary (47 km long, from 5 to 11 km wide).

The estuary is important for transport, recreation, and fisheries. The most important port is Ochakiv.

Historical events
The estuary was a naval battleground in the Russo-Turkish War of 1787–1792. The Siege of Ochakov was a key event in that war, and naval battleswhich involved the Russian Dnieper Flotilla, John Paul Jones's deep-water fleet, and the Ottoman Navyincluded the  First Battle of the Liman on June 7, 1788, and the Second Battle of the Liman on June 16 and 17.

Key landmarks
The ruins of  Pontic Olvia are located on the right bank of the Southern Bug (Boh River), right at its mouth.

There is an artificial island which is often mistaken for Berezan Island, but it is actually .

References

External links
 Dnipro–Boh Estuary at the Encyclopedia of Ukraine 

 
Estuaries of Ukraine
Estuaries of the Black Sea